Duncan Duane Hunter (born December 7, 1976) is an American former politician and United States Marine who served as a U.S. representative for  from 2013 to 2020. He is a member of the Republican Party, who was first elected to the House in 2008. He served in the U.S. Marines from 2001 through 2005 and succeeded his father, Republican Duncan Lee Hunter, a member of Congress from 1981 to 2009.

In 2017, the Department of Justice began a criminal investigation into Hunter and his campaign manager and wife Margaret Jankowski, for alleged campaign finance violations. In August 2018, both were indicted on charges including conspiracy, wire fraud, and violating campaign finance laws. In June 2019, Jankowski pleaded guilty to corruption and named him as a co-conspirator in using campaign funds for personal expenses.

Also in June 2019, federal prosecutors showed that from 2009 to 2016, Hunter had spent campaign funds on extramarital affairs with five women, including lobbyists and congressional staff. In December  2019, Hunter changed his plea to guilty on one count of misusing campaign funds. On January 7, 2020, he submitted letters of resignation to House Speaker Nancy Pelosi and California Governor Gavin Newsom, that took effect on January 13, 2020. On March 17, 2020, Hunter was sentenced to 11 months in prison, scheduled to begin in January 2021. He was pardoned by President Donald Trump in December 2020. The next day Trump pardoned Hunter's wife.

Early life and education

Hunter was born in San Diego, California, the son of Helynn Louise (née Layh) and Duncan Lee Hunter. He graduated from Granite Hills High School in El Cajon, California, in 1994, and San Diego State University, where he earned a B.S. in information systems in 2001. During his sophomore year of college, Hunter started a web design company with a friend. After graduation, he worked in San Diego as an information technology business analyst.

Military service
After the September 11 attacks, Hunter joined the United States Marine Corps. He attended Officer Candidates School at Marine Corps Base Quantico. When he graduated in March 2002, he was commissioned as a second lieutenant. He subsequently served as a field artillery officer in the 1st Marine Division after the 2003 invasion of Iraq. He completed a second tour in Fallujah, Iraq, in 2004, serving in Battery A, 1st Battalion, 11th Marines. During his second tour, he participated in Operation Vigilant Resolve, in which he fought in battles in Fallujah.

In September 2005, Hunter was honorably discharged from active duty. After his discharge he started a residential development company.

In 2007, he was recalled to active duty and deployed to Afghanistan. He was promoted to captain during his wartime deployments as an artillery officer in 2006, and to major in 2012. Hunter remained in the Marine Corps Reserve until 2017. According to Politico in August 2018, Hunter still experiences the trauma of his wartime deployments as an artillery officer in Afghanistan and Iraq.

U.S. House of Representatives

Elections
2008
On March 20, 2007, Hunter's father, Duncan Lee Hunter, announced that as part of his presidential bid he would not seek re-election to the House of Representatives in 2008, retiring from Congress after 14 terms.

After Hunter announced his candidacy for his father's seat, he was recalled by the United States Marine Corps to serve in the War in Afghanistan. On June 3, 2008, Hunter won the Republican primary with 72% of the vote in a four-candidate field and became the Republican nominee to replace his father, representing the 52nd District.

In the general election, Hunter defeated Democratic nominee Mike Lumpkin, a former Navy SEAL, 56%–39%. Hunter became the first combat veteran of either Iraq or Afghanistan to serve in the U.S. Congress; moreover, he was the first Marine to be elected who had seen combat in both conflicts.

2010
Hunter won re-election to a second term with 63% of the vote, defeating Democrat Ray Lutz and Libertarian Michael Benoit.

2012
After redistricting, Hunter's district was renumbered as the 50th District. It was pushed well to the east to cover most of inland San Diego County, while losing its share of the city of San Diego.

In the five-candidate open primary in 2012, Hunter ranked first with 67% of the vote; Democratic nominee David Secor ranked second with 17% of the vote. In the general election, Hunter defeated Secor 68%–32%. He became only the third person to represent this district since its creation after the 1960 census. Lionel Van Deerlin won the seat on its creation in 1962, and held it until the elder Hunter defeated him in 1980.

2014
In the primary election, Hunter finished first with 62,371 votes (70%) to Democrat James H. Kimber's 21,552 (24%). In the general election, Hunter defeated Kimber by 111,997 votes (71%) to 45,302 (29%).

2016
In the primary election, Hunter took 56.5% of the vote against four opponents. In the general election, he defeated Democrat Patrick Malloy, 63.9% to 36.1%.

2018
Several Democrats challenged Hunter, including Ammar Campa-Najjar and Josh Butner. Hunter was also challenged by the Republican Mayor of El Cajon, Bill Wells. In the jungle primary, Hunter received the most votes at 47.4%, followed by Campa-Najjar at 17.6%. The two faced off in the November general election.

During Hunter's 2018 re-election campaign, he repeatedly attacked his Democratic opponent Campa-Najjar over his half-Palestinian heritage. He claimed that Campa-Najjar, who converted to Christianity from Islam in high school, was an "Islamist" trying to "infiltrate Congress", describing him as a "security threat" with terrorist ties. The Washington Post fact-checkers wrote that an October 1, 2018, television ad by Hunter's campaign used "naked anti-Muslim bias" and sought to scare Californians from voting for Campa-Najjar, despite the fact that Campa-Najjar "isn't even Muslim. All the claims in the ad are false, misleading or devoid of evidence." Hunter also claimed that Campa-Najjar was being supported by CAIR and the Muslim Brotherhood; PolitiFact gave this claim its "Pants on Fire" rating. CNN, The Guardian, Buzzfeed News, and The Daily Beast described Hunter's campaign as "anti-Muslim", Vox described it as "race-baiting", and The Atlantic called it "one of the most brazenly anti-Muslim smear campaigns in recent history." After Hunter's attacks on Campa-Najjar were widely condemned, Hunter doubled down on the attacks in a direct mail letter written and signed by three defense industry lobbyists, characterizing Campa-Najjar as a national security risk. Campa-Najjar described Hunter's attacks as "pathological."

Hunter ultimately won with 51.7% of the vote, the closest race in the district since his father's initial run for what was then the 42nd District in 1980, when he unseated longtime Democratic incumbent Lionel Van Deerlin with 53 percent of the vote. In the four decades since then, a Democrat had only managed more than 40 percent of the vote in 1992, when the elder Hunter was held to 52.8 percent of the vote. Although the district is normally considered safely Republican, as evidenced by Hunter's previous wide margins of victory, the election was relatively close largely due to Hunter's indictment. He was left as one of only three Republicans representing a district south of Bakersfield, the others being Paul Cook and Ken Calvert.

Tenure
In July 2013, Hunter voted against an amendment offered by Justin Amash to rein in warrantless domestic surveillance conducted by the NSA.

In October 2013 Hunter was the only representative from San Diego County to vote against the bill ending the nation's 16-day partial government shutdown, explaining that he voted against it because it did not reduce spending or the national debt.

Hunter was an early supporter of Donald Trump's presidential bid, endorsing him in February 2016 in the earliest days of the Republican primary. He was the second member of Congress to support him. According to anonymous sources, during an address to Riverside County Young Republicans in late August 2017, Hunter said of President Trump, "He's just like he is on TV ... He's an asshole, but he's our asshole."

At a town-hall-style meeting in March 2017, Hunter was confronted by protesters. Before the crowd, Hunter asserted that the American intelligence community was filled with "seditious Obama folks" who "hate Donald Trump as much as you [those at the meeting] do" and are trying to undermine the Trump administration. He also described the American government as "Orwellian".

In April 2019, he pretended to cross the Mexico–United States border, in a bid to show that it was easy for immigrants to enter into the country. Hunter's Democratic challenger, Ammar Campa-Najjar, pointed out that actually leaving the country would violate the terms of Hunter's pretrial release after he was indicted on illegal spending of campaign funds. In the video, Hunter says he is at "the grand border wall in Yuma, Arizona," while standing next to a waist-high barrier near the border. Hunter indicated that the small barrier was in fact the border wall and elaborated that "This is what we expect to stop people, transnational terrorists, families, all illegal aliens from coming across the border. This is it." He then proceeded to step over the wall and declare "There you go. That's how easy it is to cross the border in Yuma, Arizona." The Border Patrol released a statement correcting Hunter's false claims and said that the "border wall" was actually a vehicle barrier 70–100 ft from the actual border which follows the Colorado River. Hunter had asked to stop at the barrier while on a courtesy ride-along.

In 2019, the Marine Corps sent a cease-and-desist letter to Hunter, asking him to immediately stop using the Marine Corps Eagle, Globe, and Anchor emblem and a Corps motto on political mailers to constituents. A spokesman for the Marines explained that the Eagle, Globe, and Anchor are trademarked and that federal law bars the use of the Marine seal and emblem for political purposes. Hunter used the Marine iconography in a racially charged mailer attacking his Democratic opponent and two Muslim congresswomen, attempting to link them to terrorism.

After Trump pulled 1,000 U.S. troops from Kurdish-held territory on the Syrian border south of Turkey in 2019, a bipartisan resolution was passed in the House, 354–60, that condemned the president for abandoning those U.S. allies that would allow the Islamic State of Iraq and the Levant (ISIL) to reestablish and regroup its forces, and allow the Turks to attack the YPG. Hunter was one of the two from the 53-member California congressional delegation to vote against the resolution.

Committee assignments

On August 22, 2018, after being indicted on 60 federal charges, Hunter was forced to resign from all of his Congressional committees and subcommittees.

 Committee on Armed Services (resigned)
 Committee on Education and the Workforce (resigned)
 Committee on Transportation and Infrastructure (resigned)

Caucus memberships

 Congressional Arts Caucus
Congressional Western Caucus
Republican Study Committee

Political positions 
Following in the footsteps of his father, Hunter's voting record was conservative; he has a lifetime rating of 93 from the American Conservative Union. He was a member of the Republican Study Committee, a caucus of House conservatives of which his father was a longtime member.

Economy

Hunter voted in favor of the Tax Cuts and Jobs Act of 2017. Hunter said that the plan was "good for most states" but "not as good" for California.

Healthcare

Hunter favors repealing the Affordable Care Act, and voted in support of a budget resolution to repeal it in January 2017. He expressed support for all drafts of the American Health Care Act of 2017 (AHCA), which would partially repeal and replace Obamacare, and voted for the AHCA on May 4, 2017. About the AHCA he said, "this is going to save America."

Hunter opposed the Health Care and Education Reconciliation Act of 2010, saying that it would "take away" the doctor-patient relationship and the right for people to choose "what type of operations they have", and that it would allow a "government bureaucrat" to make health care decisions for people. In an interview, Hunter said, "Things that you have problems with now would be exacerbated if you had government-run healthcare."

Environment

On environmental issues, Hunter has a 2% (out of 100%) lifetime voting score from the League of Conservation Voters, an environmental group.

Hunter rejects the scientific consensus on climate change. He believes that it is not caused by humans, that it may actually be positive, and that its cause is unknown.

Hunter does not believe the EPA should be allowed to regulate greenhouse gas emissions, and has consistently voted against any governmental limits to CO2 pollution. He would like to open up oil drilling in the United States in order to bring down gas prices.

In a 2009 interview with KPBS, Hunter expressed support for "overriding" the designation of the delta smelt as an endangered species, saying that overriding it would reduce unemployment in California.

War and military affairs

In a 2011 op-ed in Politico, Hunter opposed a complete withdrawal of American forces from Afghanistan, because of "unreliable Afghan leadership"; he accused the Obama administration of "echoing a misshapen worldview that puts American interests last". In October 2012, Hunter returned from a visit to Afghanistan, as part of a congressional delegation, with a more upbeat assessment, stating "Frankly I was very skeptical last year when I went last, and have been, on whether [the Afghans] can do this, but they are."

In December 2013, Hunter said that if a U.S. war with Iran becomes inevitable, which he "sure as hell" hoped wouldn't happen, the American response should be a "massive aerial bombing campaign" including "tactical nuclear devices". He also said that the culture of Middle Easterners made them unreliable negotiating partners.

In 2013, Hunter called for the United States to train and arm Syrian rebels and said that President Obama would be breaking the law if he bombed Syria without a Congressional mandate, and that bombing should be considered an impeachable offense. In September 2014, however, Hunter voted against a proposal to train and arm Syrian rebels fighting against ISIL extremists, saying that the proposal failed to go far enough.

Columnist Dan Murtaugh of the Press-Register suggested that Hunter's 2011 call to rebid the littoral combat ship program was an attempt to get federal funds for a shipyard in his district. Hunter turned again to the LCS program in 2012, with a call to reduce LCS builds in favor of amphibious ships, because he had read a report that the Marines had leased a ferry with similar characteristics to the LCS and the Joint High-Speed Vessel (JHSV). In 2013 Hunter said the United States Navy was overworked and spread thin, and said that a "306-ship target might represent the absolute minimum capacity the navy needs".

He called for the system of awarding the Medal of Honor to be reevaluated, due to the cases of Sergeant Rafael Peralta and Captain William D. Swenson. After Secretary of Defense Chuck Hagel became the third Secretary to deny the award to Peralta, Hunter maintained his pressure on the Pentagon. In late March 2014, he sent a letter asking the Pentagon to reevaluate Peralta's case, as well as the case of Bradley Kasal, who used his body to shield a fellow Marine from a grenade blast in Iraq in 2004. In 2017, Hunter continued his effort to have Peralta's Navy Cross elevated. In 2018, Hunter requested a review of the awarding of the Silver Star to Marine 1st Lieutenant Travis Manion, who was originally recommended for the Navy Cross.

Hunter has been supportive of certain service members who have been accused or convicted of criminal actions. Hunter has been a strong supporter of Major Mathew Golsteyn, a former Green Beret charged with murder. Hunter drafted a letter to Trump, asking him to give his personal attention to Golsteyn's case. The congressman along with other lawmakers sought presidential help in the case of Chief Special Warfare Operator Eddie Gallagher who was to stand trial in a San Diego military court for similar offenses. Hunter wrote letters to both Obama and Trump, asking them to consider giving a presidential pardon or leniency to Lieutenant Clint Lorance, a platoon commander in Afghanistan, who was convicted of second degree murder for ordering his troops during a combat mission to fire on Afghans approaching on a motorcycle at high speed who turned out to be unarmed; Trump reviewed the case and pardoned Lorance. Hunter worked with Lieutenant Colonel Jason Amerine, who testified to Congress criticizing the Pentagon for failing to mount missions to rescue Taliban hostages; Following his testimony the Federal Bureau of Investigation opened an inquiry into whether Amerine had divulged classified information to Hunter, Amerine later testified to a Congressional committee looking into whether the military retaliates against whistle blowers. In May 2019, during an attempt to defend Gallagher at a town hall meeting, Hunter claimed that he too had posed for photos with a dead enemy combatant while deployed, and called the military justice system "corrupt". In an interview Hunter claimed he had probably killed "hundreds" of civilians while serving as an artillery officer in Iraq, adding "So, do I get judged too?" Hunter appeared in federal court in San Diego on November 25, 2019, for a hearing in his own case, and supported Trump's downward sentence modification for Gallagher. Hunter's hearing was postponed until December 3, 2019.

Women

He voted against the Lilly Ledbetter Fair Pay Act of 2009, an act which made it easier to file lawsuits regarding wage discrimination.

In February 2013, Hunter voted in favor of renewing the Violence Against Women Act.

Hunter opposes women in combat and, to make a rhetorical point, in 2016 he introduced an amendment to the defense authorization act to require 18-to-26-year-old women to register for the Selective Service System (as 18-to-26-year-old men are required to do). This backfired, however, as the House Armed Services Committee voted 32–30 to adopt the amendment.

LGBT rights

He supported the Defense of Marriage Act (DOMA), which restricted federal recognition of marriage to opposite-sex couples only, and cut off federal benefits to same-sex couples. He voted to delay the repeal of Don't Ask, Don't Tell, which barred gays and lesbians from serving openly in the United States military. In 2011, Hunter advocated delaying the implementation of the Don't Ask, Don't Tell Repeal Act of 2010, which was signed into law by President Barack Obama. In 2011, Hunter introduced legislation to require that all "four military service chiefs certify that the repeal of Don't Ask Don't Tell won't negatively affect their combat units".

On the question of transgender military personnel, Hunter said that as a Marine Corps veteran, he could not imagine sharing a shower with "somebody who was a girl and didn't have the surgery to become a man but kept the girl stuff".

Abortion

Hunter is anti-abortion and believes life begins at conception. He consistently voted against all forms of abortion, as well as cloning and embryonic stem cell research. In 2017 he introduced a bill to give fetuses 14th Amendment protections. Hunter voted to ban the morning after pill in the case of rape or incest, and would like to ban IUDs.

He has been rated 0% by the abortion rights group NARAL and 100% by the anti-abortion National Right to Life Committee.

Immigration

At an April 2010 Tea Party movement rally in Ramona, California, Hunter advocated for the deportation of United States citizens who are the children of illegal immigrants. At the rally, Hunter said, "It's a complex issue and ... you could look and say, 'You're a mean guy. That's a mean thing to do. That's not a humanitarian thing to do' ... We simply cannot afford what we're doing right now. We just can't afford it. California's going under." He confirmed the comments to San Diego County's North County Times, telling the newspaper that he supported House Resolution 1868, a measure that called for the elimination of birthright citizenship in the United States. He expressed support for the 2010 Arizona immigration law, calling it a national security issue and "a fantastic starting point".

Press relations

After a reporter from The Guardian was assaulted by Republican Representative Greg Gianforte from Montana, Hunter's response was published in several newspapers. In response to questions about the AHCA's effect on those with pre-existing conditions, Gianforte put his hands around the reporter's neck and "body-slammed" him to the ground, injuring his elbow and breaking his glasses. Hunter commented: "It's not appropriate behavior. Unless the reporter deserved it."

Smoking

Hunter is an advocate of tobacco products. He uses an e-cigarette and opposes the banning of e-cigarettes on airplanes. Hunter puffed on his e-cigarette during a congressional hearing about vaping.

In July 2010, Hunter introduced legislation into the 111th Congress to allow tobacco products to be shipped to service members serving in Iraq and Afghanistan; the legislation died after being referred to committee. In 2014, Hunter moved to block a plan by the military to ban sales of tobacco products on bases and ships.

Campaign finance investigation, indictment and conviction
In April 2016, Hunter came under scrutiny from the Federal Elections Commission regarding his use of campaign funds for personal expenses from 2015 to 2016, after Citizens for Responsibility and Ethics in Washington filed an ethics complaint.

In August 2016, the Office of Congressional Ethics made a recommendation to the Ethics Committee for a full investigation. Hunter and his wife, Margaret, who was being paid $3,000 monthly from campaign funds in her role as campaign manager, shared a campaign fund credit card which had charges that were questioned. The expenses included $1,302 in charges for video games, $600 to pay for a family rabbit to travel by plane, clothing from Abercrombie & Fitch, a donation to their son's school, payments to an oral and maxillofacial surgeon, travel costs (including 32 payments for airfare, hotel stays in Arizona and Italy), groceries, a nail salon visit, tuition, non-specified items at a surf shop, and outdoor equipment.

Federal investigation
In February 2017, Hunter's campaign offices were raided by the FBI as part of a criminal investigation. Agents seized computers, other electronics, and financial records; they also seized a hard drive from Election CFO, an Alexandria, Virginia-based company that handled campaign finances on Hunter's behalf. The raid was not reported in the media until August 2017, after court documents intended to be filed under seal were accidentally released to the public.

In March 2017, the House Ethics Committee revealed that Hunter was under a Department of Justice criminal investigation for campaign finance violations and that it was deferring its own investigation as a result. The Office of Congressional Ethics report stated: "Rep. Hunter may have converted tens of thousands of dollars of campaign funds from his congressional campaign committee to personal use to pay for family travel, flights, utilities, health care, school uniforms, and tuition, jewelry, groceries, and other goods, services, and expenses." Hunter said that he repaid the money to the campaign, and denied wrongdoing. He also announced that his wife would no longer receive a $3,000 per month salary for consulting with the campaign. His lawyers Gregory Vega and Elliot Berkewas said that any improper use of campaign funds was "inadvertent and unintentional". In March 2017, in a statement issued through his lawyers, Hunter said that he had repaid his campaign approximately $60,000 in 2016. In April 2017, Hunter returned from international travel in order to address issues around his campaign funds, promising to correct any inappropriate or mistaken charges.

Indictment

On August 21, 2018, a federal grand jury of the United States District Court for the Southern District of California indicted Hunter and his wife on 60 counts of wire fraud, falsifying records, campaign finance violations, and conspiracy. The San Diego U.S. Attorney's Office accused the couple of conspiring to misuse $250,000 in campaign funds for personal expenses, as well as filing false campaign finance reports. Personal expenses charged to the campaign included vacations in Italy and Hawaii, theater tickets, and purchases in the gaming platform Steam. The indictment says that when Hunter wanted to buy some shorts for himself, his wife suggested that he falsely report the purchase as "golf balls for wounded warriors". On another occasion he tried unsuccessfully to arrange a tour of a Navy base as a cover for a family vacation trip to Italy. When the Navy couldn't arrange something on the date Hunter wanted, Hunter told his chief of staff to "tell the Navy to go fuck themselves."

The indictment also alleges that Hunter spent campaign money on "personal relationships" with five women in Washington, DC, listed as Individuals 14, 15, 16, 17, and 18 in the indictment. The women were said to have included lobbyists and one of his own congressional staffers. "Throughout the relevant period, the Hunters spent substantially more than they earned," according to the indictment. "They overdrew their bank account more than 1,100 times in a seven-year period, resulting in approximately $37,761 in 'overdraft' and 'insufficient funds' bank fees."

Speaker of the House Paul Ryan (R) called the charges against Hunter "deeply serious" and indicated that he would be stripped of his committee assignments pending a resolution of those charges. At first, Hunter refused to leave his committees voluntarily; however, following reports that the Republican Steering Committee was planning to forcibly remove his committee assignments, Hunter reversed course and agreed to step down from his committees. The San Diego Union-Tribune, Hunter's hometown paper, published an editorial calling for him to resign from Congress. Hunter's father, the former congressman, attacked the indictment as a "late hit" and claimed it was politically motivated. Hunter himself insisted that he never used campaign funds for personal expenses and that the indictment was a "witch hunt" carried out by "partisan Democrat prosecutors" and the "deep state". The Union-Tribune pointed out that the local U.S. Attorney's office is led by Adam L. Braverman, a Trump administration appointee.

Guilty plea and sentence

On August 23, 2018, both Hunter and his wife pleaded not guilty to all charges. The two entered and left the courtroom separately, and were represented by separate counsel. Hunter suggested his wife was to blame for any irregularities, saying that she handled all their personal and campaign finances and adding, "I didn't do it. I didn't spend any money illegally."

On June 24, 2019, federal prosecutors submitted a court filing alleging that Hunter used his campaign funds for extramarital affairs with five women, including three lobbyists, a congressional aide, and one of his staffers  between 2009 and 2016. Ahead of a court hearing in November 2019, Hunter expressed support for President Donald Trump's downward sentence modification for convicted war criminal Eddie Gallagher, but refused to answer reporters' questions about his case.

On December 3, 2019, Hunter pleaded guilty to one count of misusing campaign funds. Hunter said he expected to be sentenced to prison time, but hoped the judge would not sentence his wife to incarceration. On March 17, 2020, U.S. District Judge Thomas J. Whelan sentenced Hunter to eleven months in prison, followed by three months of supervised release. Whelan rejected Hunter's request to serve most or all of his sentence on home confinement, given the long duration of his criminal conduct and the amount of money misappropriated.

Margaret Hunter pleaded guilty to one count of corruption on June 13, 2019. She acknowledged that she had conspired with her husband to spend more than $200,000 in campaign funds on personal expenses. She agreed to give testimony and cooperate with the prosecution. Her plea agreement could have sent her to prison for up to five years. After a postponement due to the COVID-19 pandemic, she was sentenced to eight months home confinement and three years probation in August 2020.

Duncan Hunter was scheduled to begin his prison sentence on January 4, 2021. However, he did not serve his sentence, because both he and Margaret were pardoned by then-president Donald Trump in December 2020.

Resignation from Congress
On December 5, 2019, the House Ethics Committee informed Hunter that he had violated House rules when he cast votes in the chamber two days earlier. They said he must refrain from Congressional voting because he had pleaded guilty to a federal felony with a potentially significant prison sentence. Longstanding precedent holds that House members convicted of felonies should not take part in floor votes or committee work until the Ethics Committee reviews the matter. Although there is no constitutional rule barring a convicted felon from voting, the convicted member's party leadership usually strongly discourages a member from doing so, and the Ethics Committee has indicated in the past that convicted felons can be disciplined if they do take part in committee or floor votes.

On December 6, 2019, Hunter announced that he would resign from Congress after the holidays. By waiting until January to resign, Hunter would receive at least an additional $10,000 in monthly salary. On January 7, 2020, he submitted his letters of resignation, effective Jan 13, to U.S. Speaker of the House Nancy Pelosi and California Governor Gavin Newsom.

In January 2020, Democratic Representatives Josh Harder (California) and Max Rose (New York) introduced the No Pensions for Corrupt Politicians Act of 2020, which would prevent Hunter and other members of Congress who commit or conspire to commit campaign finance crimes from collecting a congressional pension. It is estimated that otherwise Hunter would have received an annual payment of at least $32,000 in a congressional pension, which he would have been able to begin accessing when he turned 62.

Newsom's office stated that there would be no special election to fill Hunter's congressional seat, and so it remained vacant until being filled by the November 2020 election.

Pardon by Trump
Hunter was scheduled to report to the federal prison in La Tuna, Texas, in January 2021. However, on December 22, 2020, President Donald Trump pardoned Hunter, as well as two other Republican congressmen convicted of corruption: Chris Collins of New York and Steve Stockman of Texas. The following day, Trump pardoned Hunter's estranged wife Margaret. In 2022, the fines for both were upheld, however, since the Federal Election Commission determined that the pardon did not cover the civil liability.

Personal life
In 1998 Hunter married Polish-born Margaret Jankowski, whom he had met in 1992. They have three children. In 2016, Hunter sold his home in Alpine, California, and used part of the proceeds to repay his political campaign for some of the money he had spent on personal expenses. He and his family moved in with his father, Duncan L. Hunter. In August 2020, Margaret Hunter pleaded guilty to misusing campaign funds for personal use and was sentenced to eight months of home confinement and three years of probation. She filed for divorce from Hunter in November 2020. Their divorce was finalized on January 31, 2023, and she resumed her maiden name of Margaret Elizabeth Jankowski.

References

External links

 
 
 

|-

|-

1976 births
21st-century American politicians
American people convicted of campaign finance violations
Baptists from California
Baptists from the United States
California politicians convicted of crimes
Living people
Members of the United States Congress stripped of committee assignment
Military personnel from California
People from Alpine, California
People from El Cajon, California
Politicians from San Diego
Protestants from California
Recipients of American presidential pardons
Republican Party members of the United States House of Representatives from California
San Diego State University alumni
United States Marine Corps officers
United States Marine Corps personnel of the Iraq War
United States Marine Corps personnel of the War in Afghanistan (2001–2021)
United States Marine Corps reservists